Mark Patrick Johnson (born October 17, 1967) is a former professional baseball player who played first base in the Major Leagues from 1995–2002 for the Pittsburgh Pirates, Anaheim Angels, and New York Mets. He currently works as a trader on Wall Street.

Early life
Johnson graduated from Holy Name Central Catholic High School in Massachusetts where he was a varsity letterman in football, basketball, and baseball.  Following high school, he attended a year at Worcester Academy Prep School where he played football and baseball and was an honors student.

He then attended Dartmouth College where he played football and baseball.  He was the starting quarterback at Dartmouth for two years where he set many school records, including passing for 4,413 yards.  Johnson gave up playing football after his sophomore season, though, as he realized that his prospects at a future NFL career were much lower than those available in professional baseball.  Most of Johnson's records at Dartmouth were quickly broken by future NFL starter Jay Fiedler, who passed for 6,684 yards in his college career.  However, Johnson still holds many school and Ivy League records for a left-handed quarterback.

Johnson also played on the baseball team under head coaches Mike Walsh and Bob Whalen, where he pitched, played first base and right field, and also saw some time as a designated hitter. In 1988 and 1989, he played collegiate summer baseball in the Cape Cod Baseball League for the Bourne Braves and was named a league all-star in 1988. He graduated from Dartmouth in the spring semester of 1990 with a degree in psychology.  Shortly thereafter, he was drafted by the Pittsburgh Pirates as a first baseman in the 20th Round of the Amateur Entry Draft on the recommendation of scout Rene Mons.

Minor Leagues
Johnson began his professional career with the Welland Pirates of the New York–Penn League, though his stay was short-lived as Johnson batted .375 in five games and was quickly promoted.  He finished the season with the Augusta Pirates of the South Atlantic League.  Overall, he batted .257/.361/.309 with no home runs, 14 runs scored and 21 runs batted in for his debut season.

He started off the 1991 season in Augusta again and batted .259 in 49 games before being promoted to the Salem Buccaneers of the Carolina League where he finished the season.  Johnson did not get regular playing time in Salem and was not considered a prospect by Pittsburgh, batting .256/.377/.376 with four homers, 35 runs scored and 38 runs batted in after playing in 86 games and garnering only 242 at-bats.

Johnson went to Major League Spring training with Pittsburgh in 1992 and was assigned to the Carolina Mudcats of the Southern League, where he spent the entire season.  Johnson struggled in Carolina, batting .232/.333/.334 with seven home runs, 40 runs scored and 45 runs batted in.  He followed the same course in 1993 and again wound up in Carolina where his struggles were not remedied, as he batted .233/.344/.404 with 14 home runs, 48 runs scored and 52 runs batted in.

He had a third trip to Spring training and assignment to Carolina in the strike-shortened 1994 season, when he finally regained his power stroke from Dartmouth.  In 1994 he batted .276/.384/.515 with 23 home runs, 69 runs scored and 85 runs batted in.  The strike cost him about a month of playing time which would have allowed him a chance to reach 30 homers and 100 RBIs and possible promotions to AAA and/or a September call-up to Pittsburgh.  Johnson's 23 bombs led the Southern League in 1994, while his .515 slugging percentage was second, his .384 on-base percentage and 85 RBIs placed him third in both categories, and his 67 walks were good for fourth in the league.  For his 1994 season he was selected to play in the Southern League All-Star Game and selected the Southern League Most Valuable Player.  In addition, he was selected to the Baseball America and Topps AA Postseason All-Star teams and ended his 1994 campaign by being named the Pittsburgh Pirates Minor League Player of the Year.

Major Leagues
Johnson entered Spring training in 1995 as a 27-year-old career Minor Leaguer whose minimal prospect status had long-since evaporated, although his 1994 campaign had caused Pittsburgh to reevaluate his power potential.  Johnson won Pittsburgh's first base job in the strike-shortened 1995 season, although his playing time was irregular, at best.  Still, Johnson started 63 games at first base for Pittsburgh, more than any other player.  Johnson's playing time was hindered by his struggles at the plate, as he finished the season at .208/.326/.421.  Johnson had his moments in 1995, though, as he hit 13 homers in only 221 at-bats, emerged as one of the premier pinch hitters in the National League, and displayed a smooth glove at first base.

Johnson retained his job as Pittsburgh's first baseman in 1996, this time garnering much more playing time than in 1995, as he started 83 games for the Pirates.  It was a career year for Johnson, as he set highs in hits, doubles, and runs batted in.  Johnson's power suffered though, as he matched the 13 homers he'd hit the year before, though he received 122 more at-bats in 1996 and probably would have topped 13 in 1995 had it not been for the strike.  Still, Johnson's smooth glove at first was never in doubt and he went 14-for-31 (.452) as a pinch hitter with a club-record four homers and nine runs batted in.

Johnson lost his first baseman's job to Kevin Young in 1997, though he remained on the roster as a pinch hitter and backup first baseman.  Johnson struggled in his spot starts, batting .215/.345/.315, though he provided good defense when called upon and was still clutch in pinch-hitting duties.  In the middle of a playoff race, manager Gene Lamont wanted more consistent players on his bench and Johnson was optioned to the Calgary Cannons of the Pacific Coast League, where he batted .339/.446/.609 in 34 games.  Almost a certainty to be recalled for a September 1 playoff push when rosters expanded, Pittsburgh needed to make room on their 40-man roster and designated Johnson for assignment.  He was quickly claimed on waivers by the rival Cincinnati Reds.

Cincinnati Reds
Johnson joined the Cincinnati organization on August 29, 1997 and was assigned to the Indianapolis Indians of the American Association, where he was used as a pinch hitter, going 0-for-4 before the close of the AAA season.  The Reds had acquired Johnson as insurance in case something happened to pinch hitter Lenny Harris, then considered the best pinch hitter in the National League and now regarded as one of the best pinch hitters of all-time.  Harris remained healthy and the Reds fell out of the playoff race, though, and Johnson did not receive a September recall.

Johnson went to Spring training with Cincinnati in 1998 but was cut after Harris was re-signed and showed no signs of slowing.  Again assigned to Indianapolis, Johnson batted .300/.409/.583 with 22 home runs, 65 runs scored and 75 runs batted in.  Harris was traded to the New York Mets in July and Johnson was a logical candidate to be recalled to replace the fan-favorite pinch hitter in Cincinnati, although the Reds were in fourth place and manager Jack McKeon opted to initiate a youth movement that would culminate in a 96-win season in 1999.  When Johnson was told he would not be recalled in September because there was not room for him on the 40-man roster, he told his agent that he was contemplating retirement from baseball.  His agent informed the Reds front office of this development, and they decided to move Johnson, well-liked in the Cincinnati organization, to the Anaheim Angels as part of a conditional deal as a reward for his hard work and dedication at Indianapolis.

Anaheim Angels
Johnson was traded to the Anaheim Angels on September 11, 1998 in a move long after the non-waiver deadline had ended, though the move was approved by Commissioner Bud Selig.  He was immediately added to the expanded 40-man roster and played as a pinch hitter and backup first baseman.  His time in Anaheim was brief, uneventful, and unproductive, as he went 1-for-14 with one run scored and six strikeouts.  He was non-tendered by Anaheim on December 22, 1998 and became a free agent.

Nippon Professional Baseball
He signed with the Hanshin Tigers of the Central League in Japan in the 1999 season. In the first half of the game, 19 home runs were released, which was a valuable force in Hanshin, which had no long-range guns at the time. I hit .253 / .345 / .479 in the book. In addition, in defense, he played 104 games on first base, defended 998 times, made only 6 mistakes, and had a fielding percentage of .994. In Hanshin, he was a teammate of center fielder Tsuyoshi Shinjo.

New York Mets
His time in Hanshin drew the attention of Mets manager Bobby Valentine, formerly the manager of the Chiba Lotte Marines and a long-time supporter of NPB, and Johnson was signed by the Mets on February 22, 2000.  He and Valentine both had an appreciation of the Japanese style of play and quickly became friendly, with Johnson recommending several other Western players in Japan capable of Major League play that culminated in the signing of Timo Perez from the Hiroshima Toyo Carp.  Johnson's pinch-hitting prowess and power tantalized Valentine, though he ultimately lost the job in Spring training to incumbent Matt Franco, who had been one of the best pinch hitters in the National League for the previous three seasons.  The Mets were plagued by incompetence and injuries early in 2000, though, which led to the release of Rickey Henderson, a career-threatening injury to Darryl Hamilton, and a season-ending injury to Rey Ordóñez.  Franco's pinch hitting numbers dipped a bit with increased pressure on the team and Johnson was recalled mid-season, though he was underwhelming despite some clutch pinch hits, including a home run, although overall he batted .182/.333/.318 in 22 at-bats.  Harris was re-acquired by the Mets in early June and Johnson was returned to AAA.  By July, Benny Agbayani and Jay Payton had emerged as starting players, Darryl Hamilton had recovered from his injuries, and Mike Bordick and Bubba Trammell had been acquired in blockbuster trades while the Mets were running neck-and-neck with the Atlanta Braves for the division title and had a playoff spot virtually locked up.  The Mets' fortunes had changed so much from May to September that Johnson was not even recalled when rosters expanded, though his friend Perez and his rival Franco (who had lost his roster spot to Harris and Hamilton) both received recalls and found their way onto the playoff roster.  Johnson spent the majority of his season with the Norfolk Tides of the International League, where he batted .270/.405./505.

Johnson accepted arbitration that off-season and remained in the Mets organization, where he was a favorite of the front office and Valentine.  In addition, he was instrumental in convincing former teammate Shinjo to sign with the Mets.  Shinjo became the second Japanese position player to sign a Major League contract with a North American team, shortly after Ichiro Suzuki had signed with the Seattle Mariners.  In addition, Shinjo was the first Japanese position player to sign a Major League contract with a National League team.  Ultimately, Shinjo emerged as one of the finest fourth outfielders in the game and a fan favorite, though his Major League career eventually soured.  Johnson was competing with Franco and Harris for a job as a pinch hitter in Spring training, with the consistent, slap-hitting Harris winning the job over the sluggers Franco and Johnson.  The Mets were terrible in the first half, though, and Johnson had plenty of opportunities to play second-fiddle to Harris, managing to gain 118 at-bats in the Major Leagues and helping the Mets rebound to an 82-win season, narrowly missing a third straight trip to the playoffs.  Johnson's overall numbers were mediocre, as he batted .254/.338/.475 with six home runs, 17 runs scored and 23 runs batted in.  However, Johnson provided much-needed defensive insurance for starter Todd Zeile (a converted catcher who'd played third base for nine seasons before he moved to first) and went 11-for-27 (.407) as a pinch hitter behind Harris.  Johnson also received 152 at-bats at Norfolk and batted .316/.407/.572.

Johnson was granted free agency that off-season but the Mets brought him back on a Minor League contract with an invitation to Spring training.  Johnson put his international reputation to work again, convincing Japanese free agent Satoru Komiyama to sign with the Mets.  Harris was traded in a blockbuster three-team trade and ended up with the Milwaukee Brewers and Franco signed with the Braves as a free agent, leaving Johnson as the only established pinch hitter in the organization.  He broke camp with the team that year, pinch hitting and providing late-inning defense for the sluggish Mo Vaughn.  Johnson got off to a decent start, with four pinch hits early in the season, but when Vaughn went on the disabled list with a broken pinkie finger Johnson was called on to replace him and struggled mightily, ruining his season.  In addition, while Shinjo had been a competent player and fan favorite and Perez had emerged as an everyday player, Johnson's most recent suggestion of Komiyama was completely overmatched in the Major Leagues and spent most of the year at Norfolk before returning to Japan.  Johnson was eventually demoted back to Norfolk and replaced with Tony Tarasco, who had never been a successful pinch hitter and struggled in that role with the Mets.  In addition, Tarasco embarrassed the Mets with a drug scandal involving marijuana laced with PCP.  In 51 at-bats in the Major Leagues Johnson batted .137/.267/.275 with one home run, five runs scored and four runs batted in.  He received 270 at-bats at Norfolk, batting .259/.343/.485.  The Mets were competitive with Johnson on the roster, at times trading first place with the Braves, Montreal Expos, and Philadelphia Phillies, though they collapsed after his demotion and finished in last place.  Johnson became a free agent at the end of the season and his career came to an end.

References

External links

1967 births
Living people
Major League Baseball first basemen
Baseball players from Massachusetts
Bourne Braves players
Pittsburgh Pirates players
New York Mets players
Anaheim Angels players
American expatriate baseball players in Japan
Hanshin Tigers players
Augusta Pirates players
Welland Pirates players
Salem Buccaneers players
Carolina Mudcats players
Calgary Cannons players
American expatriate baseball players in Canada
Norfolk Tides players
Indianapolis Indians players